August Tibar (24 July 1888, in Viljandi County – ?) was an Estonian politician. He was a member of Estonian Constituent Assembly. On 8 August 1919, he resigned his position and he was replaced by Anton Ratasepp.

References

1888 births
Members of the Estonian Constituent Assembly
Year of death missing